Lippajärvi (Finnish) or Klappträsk (Swedish) is a district of Espoo, a city in Finland. The district borders Lake Lippajärvi, a small lake with a drainage area of 6.9 km2, which had become heavily polluted due to human dumping since the 1940s. In recent years, the lake has been cleaned substantially and now can now be used for swimming.

See also
 Districts of Espoo

References 

Districts of Espoo